The 2004 European Tour was the 33rd golf season since the European Tour officially began in 1972.

The season was made up of 45 tournaments counting towards the Order of Merit, which included the four major championships and three World Golf Championships.

Ernie Els won the Order of Merit, defending the title he won in 2003. Despite Els dominance of the European money-list, Vijay Singh was crowned European Tour Golfer of the Year, having won the PGA Championship and deposed Tiger Woods at the top of the Official World Golf Ranking.

Major tournaments

For a summary of the major tournaments and events of 2004, including the major championships and the World Golf Championships, see 2004 in golf.

Changes for 2004
Changes from 2003 included two new tournaments, the Open de Sevilla and The Heritage, and the loss of the Benson & Hedges International Open, the Trophée Lancôme and the Nordic Open. The HSBC World Match Play Championship also became an official money-list event for the first time with an increased field determined by qualification criteria, which also meant it regained world ranking status, and the Mallorca Classic became a full European Tour event having been a dual-ranking event in 2003.

Schedule
The following table lists official events during the 2004 season.

Unofficial events
The following events were sanctioned by the European Tour, but did not carry official money, nor were wins official.

Order of Merit
The Order of Merit was based on prize money won during the season, calculated in Euros.

Awards

See also
2004 in golf
2004 PGA Tour
List of golfers with most European Tour wins

Notes

References

External links
2004 season results on the PGA European Tour website
2004 Order of Merit on the PGA European Tour website

European Tour seasons
European Tour